Indrajit Saroj is a senior politician and National General Secretary of Samajwadi Party. He is currently Member of the Uttar Pradesh Legislative Assembly from Manjhanpur Assembly constituency.

Political life
Indrajit Saroj is born on 1 January 1963 in Nagreha Khurd Paschim Sharira of then Allahabad now Kaushambi. His father Maideen was a farmer. Influenced by the ideas of Babasaheb Ambedkar from his student life, Indrajit Saroj continued to participate in political activities and movements, he graduated from Allahabad University in 1985, after which he came into the main political stream and Bahujan Samaj Party inspired by Manyavar Kanshi Ram. joined in. He was elected MLA for the first time from Manjhanpur in the 1996 assembly elections.He has been cabinet minister of Uttar Pradesh several times. He is a four time MLA from Manjhanpur Vidhansabha till now and though he lost the election to BJP's Lal Bahadur in 2017 assembly election. After differences with Mayawati, he left Bahujan Samaj Party in 2018 and joined Samajwadi Party, currently He is the Deputy Leader of oppostion the House in Uttar Pradesh Legislative Assembly and also National General Secretary of Samajwadi Party.

References

Uttar Pradesh MLAs 2022–2027
Samajwadi Party politicians from Uttar Pradesh
Living people